Vitamin K-dependent carboxylation/gamma-carboxyglutamic (GLA) domain is a protein domain that contains post-translational modifications of many glutamate residues by vitamin K-dependent carboxylation to form γ-carboxyglutamate (Gla). Proteins with this domain are known informally as Gla proteins. The Gla residues are responsible for the high-affinity binding of calcium ions.

The GLA domain binds calcium ions by chelating them between two carboxylic acid residues. These residues are part of a region that starts at the N-terminal extremity of the mature form of Gla proteins, and that ends with a conserved aromatic residue. This results in a conserved Gla-x(3)-Gla-x-Cys motif that is found in the middle of the domain, and which seems to be important for substrate recognition by the carboxylase.

The 3D structures of several Gla domains have been solved. Calcium ions induce conformational changes in the Gla domain and are necessary for the Gla domain to fold properly. A common structural feature of functional Gla domains is the clustering of N-terminal hydrophobic residues into a hydrophobic patch that mediates interaction with the cell surface membrane.

At present, the following human Gla-containing proteins (Gla proteins) have been characterized to the level of primary structure: the blood coagulation factors II (prothrombin), VII, IX, and X, the anticoagulant proteins C and S, and the factor X-targeting protein Z. The bone Gla protein osteocalcin, the calcification-inhibiting matrix Gla protein (MGP), the cell growth regulating "growth arrest specific gene 6" protein GAS6, periostin (a factor necessary for migration and adhesion of epithelial cells), plus two proline-rich Gla-proteins (PRGPs) and two transmembrane Gla proteins (TMGPs), the functions of which are unknown.

In all cases in which their function was known, the presence of the Gla residues in these proteins turned out to be essential for functional activity.

Subfamilies
Coagulation factor, Gla region

Human proteins containing this domain 
Thrombin (F2) (a.k.a. coagulation factor II; also its precursor prothrombin) – involved in coagulation
Factor VII (F7) – involved in coagulation
Factor IX (F9) – involved in coagulation
Factor X (F10) – involved in coagulation
Protein C (PROC) – roles in regulating anticoagulation, inflammation, cell death, and maintaining the permeability of blood vessel walls
Protein S (PROS1) – involved in coagulation
Protein Z (PROZ) – involved in coagulation
Osteocalcin (BGLAP) – involved in bone mineralization.
Matrix gla protein (MGP) – inhibitor of calcification of soft tissue and plays a role in bone organization
GAS6 – thought to be involved in the stimulation of cell proliferation
Transthyretin (TTR) previously known as prealbumin — carries thyroxine (T4) in blood and into cerebral spinal fluid
Inter-alpha-trypsin inhibitor heavy chain H2 (ITIH2) – plays a role in pancreas islets and many other cells
Periostin – a factor necessary for cell migration (embryonic development, and immune responses) and adhesion of epithelial cells, over-expressed in some cancers
Proline rich gla protein 1 (PRRG1 or PRGP1)
Proline rich gla protein 2 (PRRG2 or PRGP2)
Transmembrane γ-carboxy glutamyl protein 3 (PRRG3 or TMG3, PRGP3) 
Transmembrane γ-carboxy glutamyl protein 4 (PRRG4 or TMG4, PRGP4)

References

Protein domains
Peripheral membrane proteins